Sean Taylor (born 9 December 1985 in Wansbeck, Northumberland) is an English footballer who last played as a midfielder in the Football League for Blackpool, while on loan from Sunderland, for whom he did not make a first-team appearance. He moved into non-League football with Ashington in January 2007.

References

External links
 

1985 births
Living people
Footballers from Northumberland
English footballers
Association football midfielders
Sunderland A.F.C. players
Blackpool F.C. players
Ashington A.F.C. players
English Football League players